A list of American films released in 1974.

The Godfather Part II won the Academy Award for Best Picture.

Highest-grossing films (U.S.)

A–Z

Documentaries

See also
 1974 in the United States

References

External links

1974 films at the Internet Movie Database

1974
Films
Lists of 1974 films by country or language